Willian Eduardo Rosa Mateus (born 11 March 2002), commonly known as Willian, is a Brazilian footballer who currently plays as a forward for Caxias.

Career statistics

Club

Notes

References

2002 births
Living people
Brazilian footballers
Association football forwards
Sociedade Esportiva e Recreativa Caxias do Sul players